Fujiwara no Moroane (藤原 諸姉) was a Japanese noblewoman of the Nara period and sister-in-law of Emperor Kanmu.

Family 
Moroane was a member of the famous Fujiwara clan. Her father was a nobleman called Fujiwara no Yoshitsugu. Her mother was Abe no Komina.

Her sister was Empress Fujiwara no Otomuro, wife of Emperor Kanmu. Moroane was an aunt of Emperor Heizei and Emperor Saga.

Moroane married courtier Fujiwara no Momokawa. Their children were:
Fujiwara no Otsugu
Fujiwara no Tsugunari 
Fujiwara no Tabiko 
Fujiwara no Tarashiko

Her grandson was Emperor Junna.

Notes

Fujiwara clan
People of Nara-period Japan
8th-century Japanese women